Anotoceras is a genus of smooth shelled, discoidal ammonites with a depressed, subtrigonal whorl section and ceratitic sutures included in the ceratitid family Otoceratidae.

Anotoceras comes from the Lower Triassic of the Himalaya

References 

 Arkell et al., Mesozoic Ammonoidea, Treatise on Invertebrate Paleontology, Part L. Geol Soc of America and Univ Kansas press, 1957. R. C. Moore (ed)

Otoceratina
Ceratitida genera
Late Triassic ammonites
Extinct animals of Asia